9th Infantry may refer to:

9th Bhopal Infantry, a regiment of the British Indian Army
9th Infantry Brigade (Greece)
9th Infantry Brigade (United Kingdom)
9th Infantry Brigade (Lebanon)
9th Infantry Division (Greece)
9th Infantry Division (India), a formation of the British Indian Army
9th Infantry Division (Philippines)
9th Infantry Division (Poland)
9th Infantry Division (South Korea)
9th Infantry Division (United States)
9th Infantry Regiment (United States)

See also

 9th Brigade (disambiguation)
 9th Division (disambiguation)